Galacticidae is a recently recognised and enigmatic family of insects in the lepidopteran order. These moderate sized moths are 8–17 mm in wingspan and have previously been embedded within several lepidopteran superfamilies (Tineoidea: Psychidae, Urodoidea, Sesioidea and in several families of Yponomeutoidea), but Galacticidae is currently placed in its own superfamily at the base of the natural group Apoditrysia (Dugdale et al., 1999 [1998]; May, 2004).

Note: the superfamily was unintentionally called "Galaticoidea" in Dugdale et al. (1999) [1998].

The relationships of Galacticidae need reassessment with new characters including DNA data . The genus Homadaula looks remarkably like the yponomeutid genera Prays and Atemelia and some species are reminiscent of "small ermine" moths. Despite the spined abdominal segments of the pupae and a few other characters (Minet, 1986) some possess structural similarities to yponomeutids as well and have similar larval behaviour  so their removal from the Yponomeutoidea has been questioned (Mey, 2004).

The family is distributed in the Old World from Africa and Madagascar to Asia, Australia and New Caledonia. The richest genus is Homadaula with eight species. The mimosa webworm (Homadaula anisocentra) is a pest of ornamental plants , which has been introduced to eastern North America (Moriuti, 1963; Dugdale et al., 1999).

References

Dugdale, J.S., Kristensen, N.P., Robinson, G.S. and Scoble, M.J. (1999) [1998]. The smaller microlepidoptera grade superfamilies,  Ch.13., pp. 217–232 in Kristensen, N.P. (Ed.). Lepidoptera, Moths and Butterflies. Volume 1: Evolution, Systematics, and Biogeography. Handbuch der Zoologie. Eine Naturgeschichte der Stämme des Tierreiches / Handbook of Zoology. A Natural History of the phyla of the Animal Kingdom. Band / Volume IV Arthropoda: Insecta Teilband / Part 35: 491 pp. Walter de Gruyter, Berlin, New York.
Mey, W. (2004). Galacticidae (Ditrysia incertae sedis). Esperiana 1: 91-102.
Minet, J. (1986). Ébauche d'une classification moderne de l'ordre des Lépidoptères. Alexanor 14(7): 291-313.
Moriuti, S. (1963). Remarks on the Paraprays anisocentra (Meyrick, 1922) (Plutellidae), with descriptions of its larva and pupa. Transactions of the Lepidopterological Society of Japan, 14(3): 52-59.

External links
CSIRO Gallery. Six images.
Tree of Life
Natural History Museum hosts database

Pheromones of Homadaula anisocentra Accessed 13 March 2007
Mimosa webworm, updated 16 February 2012
Homadaula anisocentra resting posture from Bob Patterson's Entomology Hobby Page Accessed 13 March 2007

 
Moth families